Kurahashi is a Japanese surname. Notable people with the surname include:

, Japanese swimmer
, Japanese singer-songwriter
, Japanese writer

Fictional characters
, a character in the anime series Terror in Resonance
, a character in the manga series Assassination Classroom
, a character in the manga series Love Lab

Japanese-language surnames